The 2021–22 Cypriot First Division was the 83rd season of the Cypriot top-level football league.

Stadiums and locations 

Note: Table lists clubs in alphabetical order.

Personnel and kits 
Note: Flags indicate national team as has been defined under FIFA eligibility rules. Players and Managers may hold more than one non-FIFA nationality.

Regular season

League table

Results

Results by round

Championship round

Championship round table

Relegation round

Relegation round table

Season statistics

Top scorers

References

External links

Cypriot First Division on soccerway

Cypriot First Division seasons
Cyprus
2021–22 in Cypriot football